Lukas Flückiger (born 31 January 1984) is a Swiss professional mountain bike and cyclo-cross cyclist. He is the brother of Mathias Flückiger. He was on the start list for the 2018 Cross-country European Championship and he finished 4th.

Major results

Cyclo-cross

2005-2006
1st Cyclo-Cross Rennaz-Noville
2008-2009
1st International Radquer Frenkendorf
1st Grand Prix International Cyclocross Sion-Valais
2009-2010
1st  National Championships
1st International Radquer Frenkendorf
1st GP 5 Sterne Region
2010-2011
1st GP 5 Sterne Region
2011-2012
1st International Radquer Uster
2012-2013
1st USGP of Cyclocross # 2 - Planet Bike Cup 2, Sun Prairie
2013-2014
1st  National Championships
1st Flückiger Cross Madiswil
2015-2016
1st Cyclocross International Sion-Valais
2016-2017
1st Cyclocross International Nyon

Mountain bike

2007
 2nd National Championships
2008
 2nd National Championships
2009
 3rd National Championships
2010
 3rd National Championships
2010
 2nd  Cross-country, UCI World Championships
 2nd  Cross-country, UEC European Championships
2015
 2nd  Cross-country, European Games
 2nd  Cross-country, UEC European Championships
2016
 1st  Overall Swiss Epic (with Reto Indergand)

References

1984 births
Living people
Swiss male cyclists
Cyclists at the 2015 European Games
European Games medalists in cycling
European Games silver medalists for Switzerland
Swiss mountain bikers